"After the Love" is a song by German Dance-Band R.I.O. The song was written by Yann Peifer, Manuel Reuter and Andres Ballinas. It was released in Germany as a digital download on 10 July 2009.

Track listing
Digital download
 "After the Love" (Radio Edit) – 3:34
 "After the Love" (PH Electro Radio Mix) – 3:40 
 "After the Love" (Chriss Ortega vs. Steve Forest Radio Edit) – 3:35 
 "After the Love" (Mowgli & Bagheera Radio Edit) – 3:50 
 "After the Love" (Dan Winter Radio Edit) – 3:54
 "After the Love"  – 5:49 
 "After the Love" (Chriss Ortega vs. Steve Forest Remix) – 6:10
 "After the Love" (PH Electro Mix) –  
 "After the Love" (Dave Kurtis Remix) – 6:43
 "After the Love" (Mowgli & Bagheera Remix) - 5:45

Credits and personnel
Lead vocals – Tony T.
Producers – Yann Peifer, Manuel Reuter
Lyrics – Yann Peifer, Manuel Reuter, Andres Ballinas
Label: Zooland Records

Charts

Weekly charts

Year-end charts

Release history

References

2009 singles
R.I.O. songs
Songs written by DJ Manian
Songs written by Yanou
2009 songs
Songs written by Andres Ballinas